Actinoptera meigeni is a species of tephritid or fruit flies in the genus Actinoptera of the family Tephritidae.

Distribution
France.

References

Tephritinae
Insects described in 1927
Diptera of Europe